Julien Senderos (born September 18, 1980) is a retired Swiss basketball player who last played for BBC Nyon.

Biography

Professional career
He began his career as a professional basketball player 2002 for the Geneva Devils in the Ligue Nationale de Basketball. He played streetball in Calafell, Spain over the summer holiday.

On September 24, 2010, Senderos signed for Swiss club Sdent BBC Nyon.

International career
Senderos was 2007 member of the Swiss national team.

Personal life
Julien is the brother of the former Arsenal football player Philippe Senderos, who has also represented Switzerland at national level.

References

1981 births
Living people
Junior college men's basketball players in the United States
Lions de Genève players
Sportspeople from Geneva
Salem State Vikings men's basketball players
Swiss men's basketball players
Swiss expatriate sportspeople in the United States
Swiss people of Serbian descent
Swiss people of Spanish descent
Forwards (basketball)